Skalbmierz  is a town in south eastern Poland, in Świętokrzyskie Voivodeship, in Kazimierza County. It has 1,326 inhabitants (2004). Skalbmierz has a long and rich history, the town belongs to the province of Lesser Poland. Skalbmierz received town charter in 1342, lost it in 1869, and regained in 1927.

History 
First half of 12th century – Presumably Skalbmierz foundation
1217 – Skalbmierz first mentioned in written sources
1241 – Skalbmierz devastated by Tatars (see Mongol invasion of Poland)
1242 – Konrad I of Masovia called a meeting in Skalbmierz, where he imprisoned representatives of Lesser Poland
1309 – First mention of school in Skalbmierz
1342, 20 February – Skalbmierz gains town charter (see Magdeburg rights) from King Kazimierz Wielki
1400 – Stanisław of Skarbimierz became first vice-chancellor of Cracow Academy (Akademia Krakowska)
1427 – Skalbmierz's town charter confirmed by King Władysław Jagiełło
1483, 24 May – Cracow bishop Jan Rzeszowski confirmed the town charter of Skalbmierz
1578 – King Stefan Batory confirmed the right of Cracow curates to appoint Skalbmierz president canons of the Chapter 
1618 – Great fire of city
1652–1653 – The plague in city
1655–1657 – Total destruction of Skalbmierz by Swedes, Hungarians and Cossacks (see Deluge (history))
1781, 25 September – King Stanisław August Poniatowski confirmed current privileges of Skalbmierz
1794, 29 April – Russian general Fiodor Denisov during the retreat from Racławice robbed Skalbmierz and set it on fire
1807 and 1808 – City destroyed by the fire
1810, 17 April – Skalbmierz became capital of Skalbmierz County
1819 – Dissolution of collegiate church
1831, 24 October – Skirmish of insurgents near Drożejowice (see November Uprising)
1869 – Russian administration takes away Skalbmierz city rights, after January Uprising
1884 – Maria Skłodowska stayed in Skalbmierz
1906 – Fire of Skalbmierz church
1912 – Fire brigade established in Skalbmierz
1918 – Rise of Polish Military Organization (Polska Organizacja Wojskowa) and Scout Team
since 1919 – Railway station built in Skalbmierz (station on the route between Charsznica and Kocmyrzów)
1927, 31 March – Skalbmierz regains city rights thanks to Antoni Baum’s initiative
1927 – Stefczyk’s cash office opened, prototype of today’s Co-operative Bank (Bank Spółdzielczy, see Cooperative banking)
1931 – Creation of Committee of Military Preparation and Physical Education in Sklabmierz
1933 – Shooting association established
1933–1934 – New building of common school erected
1939, 6 and 7 September – Fights in Skalbmierz, see Invasion of Poland
1939, 14 November – Region of Skalbmierz and Działoszyce joined and turned into a state of underground activity
1944, 5 September – Pacification of Skalbmierz 
1945, 14 January – Units of Red Army entered Skalbmierz
1948, 1 August – Establishment of Communal cooperative "SCh"
1952 – Electrification of Skalbmierz completed
1956 –  Skalbmierz incorporated into Kazimierza Wielka county
1959 – Thanks to Emilian Jaros’s initiative a vocational school opened (later renamed as Team of Vocational Schools)
1969, 3 September – Skalbmierz decorated with Cross of Grunwald (3rd class)
1984, 1 October – New primary school building opened for public use
2005 – Water reservoir "Skalbmierz" built

See also
 The Lesser Polish Way

Cities and towns in Świętokrzyskie Voivodeship
Kazimierza County
Kraków Voivodeship (14th century – 1795)
Kielce Governorate
Kielce Voivodeship (1919–1939)